Lester Prosper (born 21 September 1988) is a Dominican-born Indonesian professional basketball player for the Suwon KT Sonicboom of the Korean Basketball League.

College career
Lester Prosper played four years with the State University of New York College at Old Westbury in the NCAA Division III.

Professional career
Altogether, Prosper played in 12 countries before suiting up for Columbian in the Philippine Basketball Association in 2019. He recorded a career-high 45 points in a 123–127 loss to the Barangay Ginebra San Miguel. He also played for San Miguel Beer in the Terrific 12 in Macau that year.

On March 20, 2022, Prosper signed with the Tainan TSG GhostHawks of the T1 League.

National team career
He has been a part of Indonesia's national basketball team at the 2021 FIBA Asia Cup qualification. At his home country's 90–76 victory against Thailand, Prosper collected 19 points and 13 rebounds.

References

External links
FIBA profile
Profile at Eurobasket.com
Profile at RealGM.com

1988 births
Living people
Centers (basketball)
College men's basketball players in the United States
Dominica emigrants to Indonesia
Expatriate basketball people in Mexico
Expatriate basketball people in Saudi Arabia
Expatriate basketball people in Spain
Expatriate basketball people in Sweden
Expatriate basketball people in Taiwan
Expatriate basketball people in the United States
Indonesian expatriate basketball people in the Philippines
Indonesian expatriate sportspeople in Spain
Indonesian expatriate sportspeople in the United States
Indonesian expatriates in Mexico
Indonesian expatriates in Saudi Arabia
Indonesian expatriates in Sweden
Indonesian expatriates in Taiwan
Indonesian men's basketball players
Indonesian people of Dominica descent
Naturalised citizens of Indonesia
People from Roseau
State University of New York at Old Westbury alumni
Tainan TSG GhostHawks players
T1 League imports
Terrafirma Dyip players
Philippine Basketball Association imports
Expatriate basketball people in South Korea
Suwon KT Sonicboom players
Indonesian expatriate sportspeople in South Korea